KRPV-DT (channel 27) is a television station airing God's Learning Channel in Roswell, New Mexico, United States. It is owned by Prime Time Christian Broadcasting and broadcasts from a transmitter east of town. It was Prime Time's first television station in operation.

History
On January 30, 1985, the Federal Communications Commission granted a construction permit for a new television station on channel 27 in Roswell to Prime Time Christian Broadcasting. PTCB, at the time carrying programming from the Trinity Broadcasting Network, had already been broadcasting over the local cable system on channel 12. Channel 27 began broadcasting September 15, 1986, and over the years that followed, Prime Time built additional translators and full-service stations, the first of which was constructed at Artesia. Additionally, new studios were built in Roswell in 1987.

After making its first full-power station purchase, of KMLM in Odessa, Texas, in 1991, planning began to move the Prime Time headquarters there.

The station made the final digital television transition on February 10, 2009. Its digital signal, which had been broadcast on channel 28, relocated to channel 27.

Translators
KRPV-DT has one analog translator:

  30, Las Cruces

The license for former translator KAPT-LP (channel 29, Alamogordo) was cancelled on July 20, 2021. The license for former translator KGDR-LP (channel 47, Ruidoso) was cancelled on August 4, 2021.

References

RPV-DT
1986 establishments in New Mexico
Television channels and stations established in 1986
Religious television stations in the United States